Richard Pyros (born 7 April 1986) is a British-Australian actor, who first achieved fame in the hit Australian Channel Seven TV show, Big Bite which was nominated for two AFI Awards. Whilst still studying at drama school, Pyros was selected to create an array of characters including the memorably disheveled newsreader, 'Tee Pee Moses', and for his impersonation of personalities such as Rob Sitch, Michael Caton, Harry Potter and Detective Lennie Briscoe from Law & Order.

Early life 
Pyros was born in Liverpool, England, where he attended Dovedale Junior School and sang at Liverpool Cathedral as a chorister. After moving to Australia at age eleven, he attended Trinity Grammar School (Victoria), then the University of Melbourne where he graduated with a Bachelor of Arts (Criminology) and Bachelor of Music. He then studied acting at Victorian College of the Arts Drama School under Lindy Davies.

He was awarded The Irene Mitchell Award for Acting, VCA Drama School.

Theatre and television 
Pyros has performed extensively in theatre, most recently in Ivo van Hove's lauded Hedda Gabler for the Royal National Theatre and opposite Matt Smith (actor) in the new Anthony Neilson play, "Unreachable" at London's Royal Court Theatre.

He has performed with leading Australian theatre companies (including the Sydney Theatre Company, Belvoir (theatre company), Bell Shakespeare Company and Malthouse Theatre), and around the world in countries such as England, Scotland, Ireland, Italy, France, Austria, Germany and China. He is an accomplished comedian and writer; his TV writing credits include BackBerner, Big Bite, Fam Time and Stand Up Australia! (Foxtel) writing material for host, Cameron Knight. In 2007, Richard toured his show, Gilgamesh to the Barbican Theatre, London for the world-renowned 'Bite' season, as well as to The Beijing Oriental Pioneer Theatre, The Shanghai Dramatic Arts Centre and the Sydney Opera House.

In 2012, Pyros was nominated for a Green Room Award for Best Actor, for his portrayal of Oedipus in Malthouse Theatre's version of Oedipus Rex, "On The Misconception of Oedipus", directed by Matthew Lutton. He was beaten by acclaimed actor, Colin Friels. He next appears in the Belvoir (theatre company) production of Summerfolk by Maxim Gorky in November 2020.

Prior to attending drama school, Pyros was a member of the comedy troupe 'Enter The Datsun' with Charlie Pickering, Michael Chamberlin and Charlie Clausen, writing and producing several television pilots and featuring in a number of Melbourne International Comedy Festivals.

For television, Pyros currently appears in the BBC Two/Netflix drama, Giri/Haji and next appears as a regular in the Hulu historical comedy-drama series, The Great with Elle Fanning and Nicholas Hoult. He was also recently co-writer on the Seven Network show, Fam Time and created the web series, 'Lessons For Life, with Alan Mercedes' with Charlie Clausen.

Film 
Pyros appeared in the film Hacksaw Ridge (2016), directed by Mel Gibson, in the major role of Randall 'Teach' Fuller, alongside Andrew Garfield, Teresa Palmer, Sam Worthington, Vince Vaughn, Hugo Weaving, and Rachel Griffiths. He attended its world premiere at Venice International Film Festival in September 2016.

His other film credits include a feature film version of Hamlet (with Pyros playing the eponymous lead, Prince Hamlet), directed by Oscar Redding which had its world premiere at the Melbourne International Film Festival. His performance was critically acclaimed. Alison Croggon, writing in The Australian Newspaper said, 'crucially, Redding has a brilliant Hamlet in Richard Pyros. There are times when his performance lifts the hair on the back of your neck: this Hamlet might be mad, but the method in it has a profound legibility, and his corrosive intelligence shines through every gesture.'

Also, No Budget by Christopher Stollery (official selection, Palm Springs International Film Festival 2012), Noise by Matthew Saville (official selection, Sundance Film Festival 2007), In Your Dreams (Tropfest) by Greg Williams, and Is God a DJ by Ben Chessell.

Opera 
Pyros has directed two operas, an immersive Hänsel und Gretel by Engelbert Humperdinck at the Bussey Building, Peckham (South London) and Henry Purcell's Dido and Aeneas at Kings Place, London.

Career highlights 
From 2009–2012, Pyros was a member of the resident acting ensemble at Sydney Theatre Company, selected by then Co-Artistic Directors, Cate Blanchett and Andrew Upton. In 2012, Pyros performed as Cate Blanchett's boyfriend, Alf in the award-winning production, Gross und Klein (Big and Small) by Botho Strauss adapted by Martin Crimp and directed by Benedict Andrews, which toured from Sydney to Paris, London, Vienna and Recklinghausen. His performance was described as, 'Pyros matched Blanchett blow-for-blow, in a scintillating, tour de force, acting matchup of heavyweight champions.'

Filmography
 Fisk (TV series) (2021)
 The Weekly with Charlie Pickering (2021)
 The Yearly with Charlie Pickering (2020)
 The Great (2020)
 Giri/Haji (2019)
 Hacksaw Ridge (2016)
 No Budget (2013)
 In Your Dreams (2008)
 Hamlet (2007)
 Noise (2007)

References 

1986 births
Living people
21st-century English male actors
20th-century English male actors
English male film actors
English male television actors
English male Shakespearean actors
English emigrants to Australia
Australian male television actors
Australian male stage actors
Australian male film actors
People educated at Trinity Grammar School, Kew